Mads Andersen (born 1970) is a poker and backgammon player from Copenhagen, Denmark. 
As of June 2015, his total live tournament winnings exceed $1,225,000. and Heroscore ranks him as the 16th most influent Danish poker player.

Before making his mark in the poker world, Andersen won the 2002 World Backgammon Championships. Andersen won the European Poker Tour (EPT) second season Scandinavian Open where he outlasted the field to take home DKr 2,548,040.

References

1970 births
Living people
Danish backgammon players
Sportspeople from Copenhagen
Danish poker players
European Poker Tour winners